Coronula is a genus of whale barnacles, containing the following species (those known only from the fossil record are marked '†'):
Coronula aotea Fleming, 1959 †
Coronula barbara Darwin, 1854 †
Coronula bifida Bronn, 1831 †
Coronula diadema (Linnaeus, 1767)
Coronula dormitor Pilsbry & Olson, 1951 †
Coronula ficarazzensis Gregorio, 1895 †
Coronula macsotayi Weisbord, 1971 †
Coronula reginae Darwin, 1854

References

Barnacles